The 2011–12 ECAC women's ice hockey season  marked the continuation of the annual tradition of competitive ice hockey among ECAC members.

Regular season

News and notes

October
October 1: In a match versus No. 8 nationally ranked Mercyhurst, Quinnipiac goaltender Victoria Vigilanti made 24 saves in a 1-0 shutout victory. It was the Bobcats first victory over Mercyhurst in twelve matches.
October 7–8: In a pair of victories over the Lindenwood Lions, Colgate skater Brittany Phillips accumulated a total of 10 points. In the 7-2 victory on October 7, she notched two goals, while logging an assist. One of the goals was the game-winning goal. The following day, she had seven points (two goals, five assists) in an 8-2 win. Of the four goals she scored, two were power play goals. Her seven points ranked second in program history for most points in one game. In addition, the five assists ranked second for most assists in one game. In addition, Melissa Kueber registered six points in the sweep. On October 8, she led the team with four goals scored in an 8-2 triumph over the Lions. She also notched an assist. The four tallies tied for first in program history for most scores in one game.
October 22: Clarkson sophomore forward Jamie Lee Rattray notched two goals for the Golden Knights in a 2-1 decision over the visiting New Hampshire Wildcats women's ice hockey program. The win helped the Golden Knights extend their unbeaten streak to six games. In addition, it was the 150th victory in the history of the program, dating back to the 2003-04 season. With the victory, the Golden Knights all-time mark is 150-111-38.

November
November 1: For the third consecutive contest, the Cornell Big Red scored at least nine goals in one game. Senior captain Chelsea Karpenko appeared in her 100th career game, as Jillian Saulnier led all Big Red players with two goals and three assists in a 9-2 triumph over the Syracuse Orange women's ice hockey program.
November 4: Emilie Arseneault scored a short handed goal late into the second period to give the Union Dutchwomen a 2-1 conference victory over the Clarkson Golden Knights women's ice hockey program. It was the Dutchwomen's first ECAC win since the 2009-2010 season, and only their second ECAC win since 2004.
November 19: With a second period goal versus the Colgate Raiders, Kelly Babstock of the Quinnipiac Bobcats became the program's all-time leading scorer. In just her second season, Babstock surpassed Vicki Graham, who finished with 73 career points, after the 2006-07 season. Babstock reached the milestone in her 50th career game.

Standings

In-season honors

Players of the week

Defensive players of the week

Rookies of the week

Monthly awards

Player of the month

Defensive Player of the month

Rookie of the month

See also
 National Collegiate Women's Ice Hockey Championship
 2010–11 ECAC women's ice hockey season
 2011–12 WCHA women's ice hockey season
 2011–12 Hockey East women's ice hockey season
 2011–12 CHA women's ice hockey season
 ECAC women's ice hockey

References

ECAC
ECAC Hockey